Nicotinamide phosphoribosyltransferase (NAmPRTase or NAMPT), formerly known as pre-B-cell colony-enhancing factor 1 (PBEF1) or visfatin for its extracellular form (eNAMPT), is an enzyme that in humans is encoded by the NAMPT gene. The intracellular form of this protein (iNAMPT) is the rate-limiting enzyme in the nicotinamide adenine dinucleotide (NAD+) salvage pathway that converts nicotinamide to nicotinamide mononucleotide (NMN) which is responsible for most of the NAD+ formation in mammals. iNAMPT can also catalyze the synthesis of NMN from phosphoribosyl pyrophosphate (PRPP) when ATP is present. eNAMPT has been reported to be a cytokine (PBEF) that  activates TLR4, that promotes B cell maturation, and that inhibits neutrophil apoptosis.

Reaction 
iNAMPT catalyzes the following chemical reaction:

nicotinamide + 5-phosphoribosyl-1-pyrophosphate (PRPP)  nicotinamide mononucleotide (NMN) + pyrophosphate (PPi)

Thus, the two substrates of this enzyme are nicotinamide and 5-phosphoribosyl-1-pyrophosphate (PRRP), whereas its two products are nicotinamide mononucleotide and pyrophosphate.

This enzyme belongs to the family of glycosyltransferases, to be specific, the pentosyltransferases. This enzyme participates in nicotinate and nicotinamide metabolism.

Expression and regulation
The liver has the highest iNAMPT activity of any organ, about 10-20 times greater activity than kidney, spleen, heart, muscle, brain or lung. iNAMPT is downregulated by an increase of miR-34a in obesity via a 3'UTR functional binding site of iNAMPT mRNA resulting in a reduction of NAD(+) and decreased SIRT1 activity.

Endurance-trained athletes have twice the expression of iNAMPT in skeletal muscle compared with sedentary type 2 diabetic persons. In a six-week study comparing legs trained by endurance exercise with untrained legs, iNAMPT was increased in the endurance-trained legs. A study of 21 young (under 36) and 22 old (over 54) adults subject to 12 weeks of aerobic and resistance exercise showed aerobic exercise to increase skeletal muscle iNAMPT 12% and 28% in young and old (respectively) and resistance exercise to increase skeletal muscle iNAMPT 25% and 30% in young and old (respectively).

Aging, obesity, and chronic inflammation all reduce iNAMPT (and consequently NAD+) in multiple tissues, and NAMPT activity was shown to promote a proinflammatory transcriptional reprogramming of immune cells (e.g. macrophages) and brain-resident astrocytes.

Function 
iNAMPT catalyzes the condensation of nicotinamide (NAM) with 5-phosphoribosyl-1-pyrophosphate to yield nicotinamide mononucleotide (NMN), the first step in the biosynthesis of nicotinamide adenine dinucleotide (NAD+). This salvage pathway, reusing NAM from enzymes using NAD+ (sirtuins, PARPs, CD38) and producing NAM as a waste product, is the major source of NAD+ production in the body. De novo synthesis of NAD+ from tryptophan occurs only in the liver and kidney, overwhelmingly in the liver.

Nomenclature 
The systematic name of this enzyme class is nicotinamide-nucleotide:diphosphate phospho-alpha-D-ribosyltransferase. Other names in common use include:
 NMN pyrophosphorylase,
 nicotinamide mononucleotide pyrophosphorylase,
 nicotinamide mononucleotide synthetase, and
 NMN synthetase'.

 Extracellular NAMPT 
Extracellular NAMPT (eNAMPT) is functionally different from intracellular NAMPT (iNAMPT), and less well understood (which is why the enzyme has been given so many names: NAMPT, PBEF and visfatin). iNAMPT is secreted by many cell types (nobably adipocytes) to become eNAMPT. The sirtuin 1 (SIRT1) enzyme is required for eNAMPT secretion from adipose tissue. eNAMPT may act more as a cytokine, although its receptor (possibly TLR4) has not been proven. It has been demonstrated that eNAMPT could bind to and activate TLR4.

eNAMPT can exist as a dimer or as a monomer, but is normally a circulating dimer. As a monomer, eNAMPT has pro-inflammatory effects that are independent of NAD+, whereas the dimeric form of eNAMPT protects against these effects.

eNAMPT/PBEF/visfatin was originally cloned as a putative cytokine shown to enhance the maturation of B cell precursors in the presence of Interleukin-7 (IL-7) and stem cell factor, it was therefore named "pre-B cell colony-enhancing factor" (PBEF). When the gene encoding the bacterial nicotinamide phosphoribosyltransferase (nadV) was first isolated in Haemophilus ducreyi'', it was found to exhibit significant homology to the mammalian PBEF gene. Rongvaux et al. demonstrated genetically that the mouse PBEF gene conferred Nampt enzymatic activity and NAD-independent growth to bacteria lacking nadV. Revollo et al. determined biochemically that the mouse PBEF gene product encodes an eNAMPT enzyme, capable of modulating intracellular NAD levels. Others have since confirmed these findings. More recently, several groups have reported the crystal structure of Nampt/PBEF/visfatin and they all show that this protein is a dimeric type II phosphoribosyltransferase enzyme involved in NAD biosynthesis.

eNAMPT has been shown to be more enzymatically active than iNAMPT, supporting the proposal that eNAMPT from adipose tissue enhances NAD+ in tissues with low levels of iNAMPT, notably pancreatic beta cells and brain neurons.

Hormone claim retracted
Although the original cytokine function of PBEF has not been confirmed to date, others have since reported or suggested a cytokine-like function for this protein. In particular, Nampt/PBEF was recently re-identified as a "new visceral fat-derived hormone" named visfatin. It is reported that visfatin is enriched in the visceral fat of both humans and mice and that its plasma levels increase during the development of obesity. Noteworthy is that visfatin is reported to exert insulin-mimetic effects in cultured cells and to lower plasma glucose levels in mice by binding to and activating the insulin receptor. However, the physiological relevance of visfatin is still in question because its plasma concentration is 40 to 100-fold lower than that of insulin despite having similar receptor-binding affinity. In addition, the ability of visfatin to bind and activate the insulin-receptor has yet to be confirmed by other groups.

On 26 October 2007, A. Fukuhara (first author), I.Shimomura (senior author) and the other co-authors of the paper, who first described Visfatin as a visceral-fat derived hormone that acts by binding and activating the insulin receptor, retracted the entire paper at the suggestion of the editor of the journal 'Science' and recommendation of the Faculty Council of Osaka University Medical School after a report of the Committee for Research Integrity.

As a drug target
Because cancer cells utilize increased glycolysis, and because NAD enhances glycolysis, iNAMPT is often amplified in cancer cells.  APO866 is an experimental drug that inhibits this enzyme. It is being tested for treatment of advanced melanoma, cutaneous T-cell lymphoma (CTL), and refractory or relapsed B-chronic lymphocytic leukemia.

The NAMPT inhibitor FK866 has been shown to inhibit epithelial–mesenchymal transition (EMT), and may also inhibit tumor-associated angiogenesis.

Anti-aging biomedical company Calico has licensed the experimental P7C3 analogs involved in enhancing iNAMPT activity. P7C3 compounds have been shown in a number of publications to be beneficial in animal models for age-related neurodegeneration.

References

Further reading

External links 
 
 
 
 
 

EC 2.4.2
Enzymes of known structure
Cytokines
Obesity